Advisory Council may refer to:

 Privy council, a body that advises the head of state of a nation

United Kingdom 
 Advisory Council on the Misuse of Drugs
 Pakistan–Britain Advisory Council
 Parliamentary Advisory Council for Transport Safety

United States 
 Advisory Council of Faculty Senates
 Advisory Council on Historic Preservation
 Homeland Security Advisory Council
 Presidential Advisory Council on HIV/AIDS
 Recreational Software Advisory Council

Other countries 
 Canadian Aviation Regulation Advisory Council
 National Advisory Council, India 
 National Unification Advisory Council, South Korea 
 Order of Canada advisory council
 Royal Advisory Council for Saharan Affairs, Morocco
 Space Generation Advisory Council, United Nations
 Technical Advisory Council, U.S. Federal Communications Commission
 Advisory Council (Qing dynasty)